Sophia Theresa "Sophie" Pemberton or Sophie Pemberton Deane-Drummond (13 February 1869 - 31 October 1959) was a Canadian painter considered to be British Columbia's first professional woman artist. Despite the social limitations placed on female artists at the time, she made a noteworthy contribution to Canadian art and, in 1899, was the first Canadian woman to win the Prix Julian from the Académie Julian for her portraiture. She was a near contemporary of Emily Carr, and the two artists spent much of their lives in the same small city.

Biography
Born in Victoria, British Columbia, Sophie, as she was known throughout her life, was the daughter of Teresa Jane Grautoff and Joseph Despard Pemberton (1821–1893), a successful executive with the Hudson's Bay Company and the first Surveyor-General of Vancouver Island. She first studied art at Mrs. Cridge’s Reformed Episcopal School. Working from her studio in the family home, Pemberton aimed at becoming a professional artist. At the age of 13, she exhibited her first work in a local contest and received an honourable mention, thereby launching her career. In 1890, she travelled to London and studied with Mr. Cope at the South Kensington School of Art, where she excelled in her studies, receiving first-class grades in drawing from life, the antique, and still life. She also studied at the Slade School of Art. While in London, she shared a studio with Swedish artist, Anna Nordgren, with whom she went on a sketching trip to Brittany in the mid-1890s. By the late 1890s, she was enrolled at the Académie Julian, studying with Jean Paul Laurens and Jean-Joseph Benjamin-Constant. In 1899, she had the honour of being the first woman to receive the Gold Medal awarded annually for the best work done in all 27 student ateliers in Paris, the Prix Julian. When she returned to North America, she studied in San Francisco. 

Pemberton painted at a time when her chosen media had been the domain of men. English and European influences can be seen in her work, primarily from the tradition of British portraiture and the Barbizon school but there are indications that she was aware of the French Impressionists. The painter of both portraits and landscapes, Pemberton was the first artist from the province of British Columbia to receive international acclaim when her work was exhibited at the Royal Academy in London (1897). 

Pemberton also taught painting to local female artists in Victoria. In 1909, she did the artistic decoration for the non-denominational Pemberton Memorial Chapel gifted by her family to Victoria's Royal Jubilee Hospital.

Pemberton showed her work at the Art Association of Montreal (1895 and in 1910), the Royal Academy in London (1897, 1898, 1901, 1904, 1907), the Paris Salon with honourable mention medal in 1899 for her painting Little Boy Blue (Art Gallery of Greater Victoria) (1899, and again in 1900 and 1903), in Victoria (1902, 1904), in Vancouver (1904), and in the Canadian exhibition at the Louisiana Purchase Exposition (the St. Louis World's Fair) (1904). She exhibited her work at the Doré Gallery in London in 1909 and with the Royal Canadian Academy of Arts (1904-1909). She also had work in the Island Arts and Crafts Society exhibitions in 1916, 1921, and 1922. A retrospective of her work was shown in 1947 at the precursor to the Art Gallery of Greater Victoria (AGGV), at the Vancouver Art Gallery in 1954, and a second one at the AGGV, the main repository of her work, in 1967. 

She alternated between living in England and Victoria, Canada but from 1947 until her death in 1959, lived in Victoria.

Memberships
She was elected an associate member of the Royal Canadian Academy of Arts in 1906 and was a member of the B.C. Society of Fine Arts.

Personal life
In 1905, she married Canon Arthur Beanlands, an Anglican priest, a widower and traveled with him to India. He died in 1917 and in 1920 she married Horace Deane-Drummond, who was older than her and indeed had children almost her age.

Death
Pemberton died on October 31, 1959 in Victoria and was interred there in the Ross Bay Cemetery.

Works

Sophie Pemberton Retrospective Exhibition, Vancouver Art Gallery (1954):
 St. Maria Trastevere, Rome. Oil on Canvas: 23" x 18". Signed and dated: 1898.
 Portrait of Horace Deane Drummond. Oil on Canvas: 27 1/2" x 22". 1925.
 La Napoule, France. Oil on Board, 11 1/2" x 15". Signed and dated: 1926.
 Woods, Dymock. Oil on Panel: 19 1/2" x 14".
 Portrait of Armine Pemberton. Oil on Canvas: 19" x 15 1/2". Signed and dated: 1901.
 Farmyard near Dieppe. Oil on Canvas: 18" x 25". Signed and dated: 1895.
 Church at Fecamp. Oil on Canvas: 16" x 19". C. 1895.
 Market, Rouen. Oil on Canvas: 12" x 18". C. 1895.
 House Drive, Newport Ave., Victoria. Oil on Canvas: 13" x 17". 1928.
 Paso Robles. Oil on Canvas: 15" x 24 1/2".
 View of Victoria. Watercolour: 6" x 15". C. 1902.
 Chinese Gardens. Watercolour: 9 1/2" x 17". Signed and dated: 1902.
 B.C Coast Scene. Watercolour: 9" x 13". Signed and dated: 1895.
 The Olympics from Vancouver Island. Oil on Canvas: 17 1/2" x 29 1/2". Signed and dated: 1908.
 Girl with Blossoms. Oil on Canvas: 35" x 27".
 Purcell's Home, Westminster. Oil on Canvas: 13" x 18".
 Arbutus Trees, Vancouver Island. Oil on Canvas: 13" x 20 1/2".
 Italian Peasant Woman. Oil on Canvas: 34" x 25". Signed and dated: 1903.
 Negro Girl. Oil on Canvas: 23" x 19". Signed and dated: 1897.
 Edge of a Wood. Oil on Canvas. 18" x 23".
 Island Landscape. Oil on Canvas: 11 1/2" x 17 1/2".
 Road, Vancouver Island. Oil on Canvas: 13 1/2" x 14 ". Signed and dated: 1908.

Publications 

 "Art Lovers Crowd City Centre To View Drummond Collection". Victoria Colonist, B.C. (August 10, 1949): p. 21.
 "Artist Member of B.C. Pioneer Family Back in Canada After Long Absence". Montreal Daily Star P.Q. (August 13, 1949).
 "Painting Displayed". The Daily Colonist Victoria, B.C. (March 26, 1947).
 "Of City Artist Now on Display". The Daily Colonist Victoria, B.C. (March 29, 1947).
 "Former Victoria Artist Exhibits Pictures Here". Victoria Daily Times, B.C. (March 28, 1947).
 Learoyd, Eileen. "Artist From Pioneer Family Home After 23 Years Abroad". Victoria Colonist, B.C. (August 7, 1949).
 "Paintings, $7,000 Left to Art Gallery". Victoria Colonist, B.C. (November 13, 1959).
 Palette. "Noted B.C. Artist's Work At Gallery". Vancouver Province, B.C. (February 20, 1954).
 Palette. "Top B.C. Painter Shows At Gallery". Vancouver Province, B.C. (February 27, 1954).
 London Evening Free Press, Ont (April 13, 1954).
 "Exposition conjointe". Le Soleil, Quebec, P.Q. (Aug 20, 1949).
 ""Old Pewter" Luncheon Topic. Vancouver Province, B.C. (January 30, 1954).
 Uhthoff, Ina D.D. "Some Emily Carr Paintings Now on Display First Time. The Daily Colonist, Victoria, B.C. (July 7, 1954).
 Scott, Andrew. Vancouver Sun, B.C. (October 27, 1978).

References

External links 
 Sophie Pemberton on Art Gallery of Greater Victoria
 Sophie Pemberton on Artnet

1869 births
1959 deaths
Sophie Pemberton
19th-century Canadian painters
20th-century Canadian painters
19th-century Canadian women artists
20th-century Canadian women artists
Landscape artists
Canadian portrait painters
Artists from Victoria, British Columbia
Canadian women painters
Académie Julian alumni
Canadian Impressionist painters
Members of the Royal Canadian Academy of Arts